Max Oliver Clark (born 19 January 1996) is an English professional footballer who plays as a defender or a midfielder for League Two club Stevenage. He has represented England at under-16 and under-17 levels.

Club career

Hull City
Born in Kingston upon Hull, East Riding of Yorkshire, Clark started out at Barham Boys Club before joining the youth system of Hull City in 2006, where he began his youth career. After progressing through the academy, Clark signed his first professional contract with the club and was promoted to the development squad. After a season with the development squad, Clark signed a one-year contract extension with the club, which was later extended once more.

Ahead of the 2017–18 season, Clark was featured in the first team's pre–season after being called up by new Manager Leonid Slutsky. He made his league debut for Hull City on the opening day of the 2017–18 season, 5 August 2017, away at Aston Villa, in a 1–1 draw. Since making his debut, Clark found himself, competing with new signing Stephen Kingsley over the left–back position. Over several months, both Clark and Kingsley fought each over the left–back position, which resulted in both of them either placed on the substitute bench. As a result of his performance, the club began a negotiation deal over a new contract for Clark. After being on the substitute at the beginning of 2018, he regained back his first team place in the left–back position by February. Over the next two months, Clark continued to feature in the left–back before losing his place to Kingsley for the rest of the season. The 2017–18 season proved to be Clark breakthrough at Hull City, as 30 appearances in all competitions.

However, his future at Hull City was in doubt as it was yet finalised over the last eight months since opening talks and reportedly turned down the contract. On 18 May 2018, Clark was among four players to be offered a new contract by the club.

Loan Spell at Cambridge United
On 25 March 2016, Clark signed for League Two club Cambridge United on loan until the end of 2015–16. He made his debut later that day as a 55th-minute substitute for Luke Berry in a 3–0 defeat away to Bristol Rovers. In a follow up match against Oxford United on 28 March 2010, he started and played 75 minutes before coming off as a substitute, in a 0–0 draw. Clark finished his loan spell with nine appearances before returning to his parent club at the end of the season.

On 30 June 2016, Clark re-signed for Cambridge United on a six-month loan. His first appearance after rejoining the club came on the opening day of 2016–17 season in a 1–1 draw at home to Barnet. Since joining the club for the second time, he continued to regain his first team place throughout the season. Clark then set up two goals during a match against Cheltenham Town on 26 November 2016, in a 3–1 win. On 10 December 2016, he scored his first goal for the club, in a 5–0 thrashing win over Hartlepool United. On 1 January 2017, Clark's loan at Cambridge was extended until the end of the season. After being featured in the first team for the next two months, Clark, however, was sent–off for a straight red card for a late tackle on Nicky Deverdics, in a 1–0 loss against Hartlepool United on 14 March 2017. Although he was suspended, Clark never played for the side for the rest of the season. He completed the loan spell with 35 appearances and one goal in all competitions before returning to his parent club.

Vitesse
Clark signed for Eredivisie club Vitesse on 22 June 2018 on a three-year contract after rejecting a new contract with Hull. Hull received compensation from Vitesse, reported by the Hull Daily Mail as "in the region of £400,000". On 9 August 2018, Clark made his Vitesse debut as well as his European debut during their 1–0 defeat to Basel in the UEFA Europa League third qualifying round, replacing Alexander Büttner with three minutes remaining.

Hull City
Clark returned to Hull City on 1 February 2021 on a short 4 month deal. On 18 May 2021, the club announced that Clark would leave the club at the end of the 2020–21 season.

Fleetwood Town
On 17 June 2021, Clark agreed a one-year deal to join Fleetwood Town with the club holding the option for a second year.

On 20 January 2022, Clark left Fleetwood Town by mutual consent.

Rochdale
On 21 January 2022, Clark signed for Rochdale on a deal until the end of the season.

Stevenage
On 16 June 2022, Clark agreed a deal to join Stevenage upon the expiration of his contract with Rochdale, having opted against extending his short-term contract.

International career
While at the academy, Clark was first called up to the England under-16 team on 15 October 2010 against Wales. He made 12 appearances for England U16s.

In August 2012, Clark was called up by the England under-17 team for the first time. He played in three matches for England U17s against Italy, Turkey and Portugal.

Clark was also called up by the England under-18 team for the first time in November 2013.

Personal life
Growing up, Clark attended Ings Road Primary School and Malet Lambert High School.

Career statistics

References

External links
Max Clark profile at the Football Association website

1996 births
Living people
Footballers from Kingston upon Hull
English footballers
England youth international footballers
Association football defenders
Association football midfielders
Hull City A.F.C. players
Cambridge United F.C. players
SBV Vitesse players
Fleetwood Town F.C. players
Rochdale A.F.C. players
Stevenage F.C. players
English Football League players
Eredivisie players
English expatriate footballers
Expatriate footballers in the Netherlands
English expatriate sportspeople in the Netherlands